In common usage, the abscissa refers to the  (x) coordinate and the ordinate refers to the  (y) coordinate of a standard two-dimensional graph. 

The distance of a point from the y-axis, scaled with the x-axis, is called the abscissa or x coordinate of the point. The distance of a point from the x-axis scaled with the y-axis is called the ordinate or y coordinate of the point.

For example, if (x, y) is an ordered pair in the Cartesian plane, then the first coordinate in the plane (x) is called the abscissa and the second coordinate (y) is the ordinate.

In mathematics, the abscissa (plural abscissae or abscissas) and the ordinate are respectively the first and second coordinate of a point in a Cartesian coordinate system:

abscissa -axis (horizontal) coordinate
ordinate -axis (vertical) coordinate

Usually these are the horizontal and vertical coordinates of a point in plane, the rectangular coordinate system.  An ordered pair consists of two terms—the abscissa (horizontal, usually x) and the ordinate (vertical, usually y)—which define the location of a point in two-dimensional rectangular space:

The abscissa of a point is the signed measure of its projection on the primary axis, whose absolute value is the distance between the projection and the origin of the axis, and whose sign is given by the location on the projection relative to the origin (before: negative; after: positive).

The ordinate of a point is the signed measure of its projection on the secondary axis, whose absolute value is the distance between the projection and the origin of the axis, and whose sign is given by the location on the projection relative to the origin (before: negative; after: positive).

Etymology 
Though the word "abscissa" has been used at least since De Practica Geometrie published in 1220 by Fibonacci (Leonardo of Pisa), its use in its modern sense may be due to Venetian mathematician Stefano degli Angeli in his work Miscellaneum Hyperbolicum, et Parabolicum of 1659.

In his 1892 work  ("Lectures on history of mathematics"), volume 2, German historian of mathematics Moritz Cantor writes:

At the same time it was presumably by [Stefano degli Angeli] that a word was introduced into the mathematical vocabulary for which especially in analytic geometry the future proved to have much in store. […] We know of no earlier use of the word abscissa in Latin original texts.

The use of the word “ordinate” is related to the Latin phrase “linea ordinata appliicata”, or “line applied parallel”.

In parametric equations
In a somewhat obsolete variant usage, the abscissa of a point may also refer to any number that describes the point's location along some path, e.g. the parameter of a parametric equation. Used in this way, the abscissa can be thought of as a coordinate-geometry analog to the independent variable in a mathematical model or experiment (with any ordinates filling a role analogous to dependent variables).

See also

 Dependent and independent variables
 Function (mathematics)
 Relation (mathematics)
 Line chart

References

External links
 

Elementary mathematics
Coordinate systems
Dimension

de:Kartesisches Koordinatensystem#Das Koordinatensystem im zweidimensionalen Raum